NGC 137 is a lenticular galaxy in the constellation of Pisces. It was discovered by William Herschel on November 23, 1785.

References

External links 
 

Lenticular galaxies
0137
00309
01888
Astronomical objects discovered in 1785
Pisces (constellation)